Riversleigh is a rural locality in the Shire of Murweh, Queensland, Australia.

History 
The locality takes its name from the parish, which in turn took its name from a pastoral station. The name appears on the 1887 Post Master General's map of Queensland. The name of the pastoral station is thought to reflect its situation on Angellala Creek, near its junction with the Warrego River. The locality was officially bounded on 28 March 2002.

Road infrastructure
The Warrego Highway passes to the north and the Mitchell Highway to the west.

See also
Riversleigh World Heritage Area
Riversleigh Station

References

Shire of Murweh
Localities in Queensland